A non-disclosure agreement (NDA) is a legal contract or part of a contract between at least two parties that outlines confidential material, knowledge, or information that the parties wish to share with one another for certain purposes, but wish to restrict access to. Doctor–patient confidentiality (physician–patient privilege), attorney–client privilege, priest–penitent privilege and bank–client confidentiality agreements are examples of NDAs, which are often not enshrined in a written contract between the parties.

It is a contract through which the parties agree not to disclose any information covered by the agreement. An NDA creates a confidential relationship between the parties, typically to protect any type of confidential and proprietary information or trade secrets. As such, an NDA protects non-public business information. Like all contracts, they cannot be enforced if the contracted activities are illegal. NDAs are commonly signed when two companies, individuals, or other entities (such as partnerships, societies, etc.) are considering doing business and need to understand the processes used in each other's business for the purpose of evaluating the potential business relationship. NDAs can be "mutual", meaning both parties are restricted in their use of the materials provided, or they can restrict the use of material by a single party. An employee can be required to sign an NDA or NDA-like agreement with an employer, protecting trade secrets. In fact, some employment agreements include a clause restricting employees' use and dissemination of company-owned confidential information. In legal disputes resolved by settlement, the parties often sign a confidentiality agreement relating to the terms of the settlement. Examples of this agreement are The Dolby Trademark Agreement with Dolby Laboratories, the Windows Insider Agreement, and the Halo CFP (Community Feedback Program) with Microsoft.

In some cases, employees who are dismissed following their complaints about unacceptable practices (whistleblowers), or discrimination against and harassment of themselves, may be paid compensation subject to an NDA forbidding them from disclosing the events complained about. Such conditions in an NDA may not be enforceable in law, although they may intimidate the former employee into silence.

Terminology
It is also known as a confidentiality agreement (CA), confidential disclosure agreement (CDA), proprietary information agreement (PIA), secrecy agreement (SA), or non-disparagement agreement.

General types 
A non-disclosure agreement (NDA) may be classified as unilateral, bilateral, or multilateral:

Unilateral 
A unilateral NDA (sometimes referred to as a one-way NDA) involves two parties where only one party (i.e., the disclosing party) anticipates disclosing certain information to the other party (i.e., the receiving party) and requires that the information be protected from further disclosure for some reason (e.g., maintaining the secrecy necessary to satisfy patent laws or legal protection for trade secrets, limiting disclosure of information prior to issuing a press release for a major announcement, or simply ensuring that a receiving party does not use or disclose information without compensating the disclosing party).

Bilateral
A bilateral NDA (sometimes referred to as a mutual NDA or a two-way NDA) involves two parties where both parties anticipate disclosing information to one another that each intends to protect from further disclosure. This type of NDA is common for businesses considering some kind of joint venture or merger.

When presented with a unilateral NDA, some parties may insist upon a bilateral NDA, even though they anticipate that only one of the parties will disclose information under the NDA. This approach is intended to incentivize the drafter to make the provisions in the NDA more "fair and balanced" by introducing the possibility that a receiving party could later become a disclosing party or vice versa, which is not an entirely uncommon occurrence.

Multilateral 
A multilateral NDA involves three or more parties where at least one of the parties anticipates disclosing information to the other parties and requires that the information be protected from further disclosure. This type of NDA eliminates the need for separate unilateral or bilateral NDAs between only two parties. E.g., a single multiparty NDA entered into by three parties who each intend to disclose information to the other two parties could be used in place of three separate bilateral NDAs between the first and second parties, second and third parties, and third and first parties.

A multilateral NDA can be advantageous because the parties involved review, execute, and implement just one agreement. However, this advantage can be offset by more complex negotiations that may be required for the parties involved to reach a unanimous consensus on a multilateral agreement.

Content 
A non-disclosure agreement can protect any type of information that is not generally known. However, non-disclosure agreements may also contain clauses that will protect the person receiving the information so that if they lawfully obtained the information through other sources they would not be obligated to keep the information secret. In other words, the non-disclosure agreement typically only requires the receiving party to maintain information in confidence when that information has been directly supplied by the disclosing party. However, it is sometimes easier to get a receiving party to sign a simple agreement that is shorter, less complex and does not contain safety provisions protecting the receiver.

Some common issues addressed in an NDA include:

 outlining the parties to the agreement;
 the definition of what is confidential, i.e. the information to be held confidential. Modern NDAs will typically include a laundry list of types of items that are covered, including unpublished patent applications, know-how, schema, financial information, verbal representations, customer lists, vendor lists, business practices/strategies, etc.;
 the disclosure period – information not disclosed during the disclosure period (e.g., one year after the date of the NDA) is not deemed confidential;
 the exclusions from what must be kept confidential. Typically, the restrictions on the disclosure or use of confidential data will be invalid if
 the recipient had prior knowledge of the materials;
 the recipient gained subsequent knowledge of the materials from another source;
 the materials are generally available to the public; or
 the materials are subject to a subpoena – although many practitioners regard that fact as a category of permissible disclosure, not as a categorical exclusion from confidentiality (because court-ordered secrecy provisions may apply even in case of a subpoena). In any case, a subpoena would more likely than not override a contract of any sort;
 provisions restricting the transfer of data in violation of laws governing export control and national security;
 the term and conditions (in years) of the confidentiality, i.e. the time period of confidentiality;
 the term (in years) the agreement is binding;
 permission to obtain ex-parte injunctive relief;
 description of the actions that need to be done with the confidential materials upon the agreement ending;
 the obligations of the recipient regarding the confidential information, typically including some version of obligations:
 to use the information only for enumerated purposes;
 to disclose it only to persons with a need to know the information for those purposes;
 to use appropriate efforts (not less than reasonable efforts) to keep the information secure. Reasonable efforts is often defined as a standard of care relating to confidential information that is no less rigorous than that which the recipient uses to keep its own similar information secure; and
 to ensure that anyone to whom the information is disclosed further abides by obligations restricting use, restricting disclosure, and ensuring security at least as protective as the agreement; and
 types of permissible disclosure – such as those required by law or court order (many NDAs require the receiving party to give the disclosing party prompt notice of any efforts to obtain such disclosure, and possibly to cooperate with any attempt by the disclosing party to seek judicial protection for the relevant confidential information).
 the law and jurisdiction governing the parties. The parties may choose exclusive jurisdiction of a court of a country.

Australia
Deeds of confidentiality and fidelity (also referred to as deeds of confidentiality or confidentiality deeds) are commonly used in Australia. These documents generally serve the same purpose as and contain provisions similar to non-disclosure agreements (NDAs) used elsewhere. However, these documents are legally treated as deeds and are thus binding, unlike contracts, without consideration.

India
Use of NDAs are on the rise in India and is governed by the Indian Contract Act 1872. Use of an NDA is crucial in many circumstances, such as to tie in employees who are developing patentable technology if the employer intends to apply for a patent. Non-disclosure agreements have become very important in light of India's burgeoning outsourcing industry. In India, an NDA must be stamped to be a valid enforceable document.

United Kingdom

In Britain, in addition to use to protect trade secrets, NDAs are often used as a condition of a financial settlement in an attempt to silence whistleblowing employees from making public the misdeeds of their former employers. There is law allowing protected disclosure despite an NDA, although employers sometimes intimidate the former employee into silence despite this.

United States
NDAs are very common in the United States, with more than one-third of jobs in America containing an NDA. However, the United States Congress passed the Speak Out Act in 2022, which prohibits NDAs with regard to sexual harassment and assault, and the bill was signed into law by President Joe Biden on December 7, 2022.

In some states, most notably California, there are some special circumstances relating to non-disclosure agreements and non-compete clauses. California's courts and legislature have signaled that they generally value an employee's mobility and entrepreneurship more highly than they do protectionist doctrine.

See also 
 Arrow information paradox
 Attorney–client privilege
 Bank–client confidentiality
 Due diligence
 Gag order
 Non-compete clause
 Physician–patient privilege
 Severance package

References

External links 
 Confidentiality and Confidential Disclosure Agreements (CDA) booklet edited by the UK Intellectual Property Office - (2005-01)
 Information about non-disclosure-agreements (NDAs) published by the UK Intellectual Property Office - (2018-01-15)

Information sensitivity
Intellectual property law
Legal documents
Labour law
Secrecy
Trade secrets